Asiad or ASIAD may refer to:

 Asiad, another name for the Asian Games
 ASIAD, an acronym for Aviation Security in Airport Development

See also

Asiad Main Stadium (disambiguation)